Ryparken is an area in the northern part of Østerbro, Copenhagen. Close to the ethnic and diverse neighborhood of Nørrebro, yet still in the 2100 Østerbro zip code, Ryparken defies easy definition. The area is well connected both by buses and by the S-train Ryparken station, formerly known as Lyngbyvej station until 1972.

See also
 Ryparken station

References
 Ryparken.dk - Om Ryparken 

Copenhagen city districts